Chanchi railway station is a Kolkata Suburban Railway station on the Howrah–Bardhaman chord line operated by Eastern Railway zone of Indian Railways. It is situated at Chanchai in Purba Bardhaman district in the Indian state of West Bengal. Number of Local trains stop at Chanchai railway station.

History
The Howrah–Bardhaman chord, the 95 kilometers railway line was constructed in 1917. It was connected with  through Dankuni after construction of Vivekananda Setu in 1932. Howrah to Bardhaman chord line including Chanchai railway station was electrified in 1964–66.

Sat Deul
Sat Deul "is a beautifully constructed 10th century temple which resembles the Odisha art pattern of rekh." It is located nearby.

References

Railway stations in Purba Bardhaman district
Howrah railway division
Kolkata Suburban Railway stations